Irineu Gassen (born 24 November 1942) is a Brazilian Roman Catholic bishop.

Ordained to the priesthood on 27 July 1968, Gassen was named bishop of the Roman Catholic Diocese of Vacaria, Brazil on 28 May 2008.

References 

1960 births
Living people
People from Rio Grande do Sul
21st-century Roman Catholic bishops in Brazil
Roman Catholic bishops of Vacaria